"Hey What Now!" is a song by Australian pub rock band the Cockroaches. It was released in July 1988 as the lead single from the band's second studio album Fingertips. The song peaked at number 28 in Australia.

Track listing
7" single (K 533)'
Side A "Hey What Now!" 
Side B "Marie"

12" single (X 13327)/ CD Maxi'
Side A "Hey What Now!" (Extended Hey, Hey mix)
Side B1 "Hey What Now!" (LP Version)
Side B2 "Hey What Now!" (991/2 Dub mix)
Side B3 "Marie"

Charts

References

1988 singles
1988 songs
Mushroom Records singles
The Cockroaches songs